Roloff Township is the sole township of McIntosh County, North Dakota, United States; the rest of the county is unorganized territory.  It lies in the northeastern corner of the county and borders the following other townships:
Haag Township, Logan County — north
Norden Township, LaMoure County — northeast
Northwest Township, Dickey County — east
German Township, Dickey County — southeast corner

External links
Official map by the United States Census Bureau; McIntosh County listed on page 6

Townships in McIntosh County, North Dakota
Townships in North Dakota